The Tahuya  River is a stream in the U.S. state of Washington. It originates at Tahuya Lake in western Kitsap Peninsula and flows south, emptying into Hood Canal near the Great Bend.

Course
The Tahuya River originates at Tahuya Lake, west of Green Mountain and northwest of Gold Mountain. Tahuya Lake is fed by two principal streams, Tin Mine Creek and Gold Creek. From the lake the Tahuya River flows south and slightly west. Panther Creek, flowing from Panther Lake, joins the river. Numerous small streams and wetlands drain into the river. Near Hood Canal the river flows becomes braided as it flows through a wetland-dominated valley. It broadens into a muddy bay as it enters Hood Canal near the town of Tahuya.

See also
 List of rivers of Washington

References

Rivers of Washington (state)
Rivers of Kitsap County, Washington
Rivers of Mason County, Washington